Connie Mhone (July 9, 1968 – January 11, 2016) was a Malawian netball player and netball coach for the Under 21 team.

References

Malawian netball players
Malawian netball coaches
1968 births
2016 deaths